The Human Contract is a 2008 drama film written and directed by Jada Pinkett Smith and starring Jason Clarke and Paz Vega. The DVD was released on June 30, 2009. This is Jada Pinkett Smith's directorial debut.

Plot
A successful but unhappy businessman (Clarke) meets a free-spirited stranger (Vega) who tempts him to explore reckless love.

Cast
 Jason Clarke as Julian Wright, a successful but unhappy businessman
 Paz Vega as Michael, a free-spirited, mysterious and married beauty whom he falls in love with
 Ted Danson as E.J Winters
 Idris Elba as Larry, Julian's friend
 Jada Pinkett Smith as Rita, Julian's sister
 Nicole Muirbrook Wagner as Thalia
 Titus Welliver as Praylis
 T.J. Thyne as Greg
 Joanna Cassidy as Rose
 Steven Brand as Boyd
 Tessa Thompson as Waitress

Production
Filming took place in Los Angeles starting the week of November 11, 2007.

References

External links
 
 

2008 direct-to-video films
2008 films
2008 drama films
American drama films
Films shot in Los Angeles
2008 directorial debut films
Overbrook Entertainment films
Films scored by Anthony Marinelli
2000s English-language films
2000s American films